The following elections occurred in the year 1984.

Africa
 1984 Beninese parliamentary election
 1984 Botswana general election
 1984 Burundian presidential election
 1984 Cameroonian presidential election
 1984 Comorian presidential election
 1984 Guinea-Bissau legislative election
 1984 Moroccan parliamentary election
 1984 Somali parliamentary election
 1984 South African general election
 1984 Seychellois presidential election
 1984 Zairean presidential election

Asia
 1984 Iranian legislative election
 1984 Israeli legislative election
 1984 Philippine parliamentary election
 1984 Singaporean general election
 1984 Soviet Union legislative election
 1984 Taiwan presidential election

India
 1984 Indian general election in Tamil Nadu
 1984 Indian general election
 1984 Tamil Nadu Legislative Assembly election

Australia
 1984 Archerfield state by-election
 1984 Australian federal election
 1984 Corangamite by-election
 1984 Elizabeth state by-election
 1984 Hughes by-election
 1984 New South Wales state election
 1984 Australian referendum
 1984 Richmond by-election
 1984 Stafford state by-election
 1984 Western Australian daylight saving referendum

Europe
 1984 Danish parliamentary election
 1984 European Parliament election
 1984 Faroese parliamentary election
 1984 Gibraltar general election
 1984 Luxembourgian legislative election
 1984 Soviet Union legislative election

European Parliament
 1984 European Parliament election
 1984 European Parliament election in Belgium
 1984 European Parliament election in Denmark
 1984 European Parliament election in Sardinia
 1984 European Parliament election in the United Kingdom
 1984 European Parliament election in France
 1984 European Parliament election in Greece
 1984 European Parliament election in Ireland
 1984 European Parliament election in Italy
 1984 European Parliament election in Luxembourg
 1984 European Parliament election in the Netherlands
 1984 European Parliament election in West Germany
 1984 European Parliament election in France
 1984 European Parliament election in West Germany
 1984 European Parliament election in Italy
 1984 European Parliament election in Sardinia

Spain
 1984 Basque parliamentary election
 Catalan parliamentary election, 1984

United Kingdom
 1984 Chesterfield by-election
 1984 Cynon Valley by-election
 1984 Enfield Southgate by-election
 1984 European Parliament election in the United Kingdom
 1984 Portsmouth South by-election
 1984 Stafford by-election
 1984 South West Surrey by-election

United Kingdom local
 1984 Scottish District local elections
 1984 United Kingdom local elections

English local
 1984 Bristol City Council election
 1984 Manchester Council election
 1984 Trafford Council election
 1984 Wolverhampton Council election

North America
 1984 Belizean legislative election
 1984 Guatemalan Constitutional Assembly election
 1984 Nicaraguan general election
 1984 Panamanian general election
 1984 Salvadoran presidential election

Canada
 1984 Canadian federal election
 1984 Edmonton municipal by-election
 1984 Liberal Party of Canada leadership election
 1984 Nova Scotia general election

Caribbean
 1984 Antiguan general election
 1984 Tobago House of Assembly election

United States
 1984 United States presidential election
 1984 United States House of Representatives elections
 1984 United States Senate elections
 1984 United States gubernatorial elections

United States gubernatorial
 1984 United States gubernatorial elections
 1984 Washington gubernatorial election

South America 
 1984 Argentine Beagle conflict dispute resolution referendum
 1984 Ecuadorian general election
 1984 Uruguayan general election

Oceania
 1984 New Zealand general election

Australia
 1984 Archerfield state by-election
 1984 Australian federal election
 1984 Corangamite by-election
 1984 Elizabeth state by-election
 1984 Hughes by-election
 1984 New South Wales state election
 1984 Australian referendum
 1984 Richmond by-election
 1984 Stafford state by-election
 1984 Western Australian daylight saving referendum

See also

 
1984
Elections